Assignment Foreign Legion is an American TV series made in Britain that ran for 26 episodes from 1956 to 1957. It was hosted by Merle Oberon and financed by CBS.

Directors included Don Chaffey, Michael McCarthy and Lance Comfort.

Premise
A female journalist (played by Merle Oberon seeks the stories behind the men of the foreign legion.

Production
The series was shot on location in Algeria and Morocco with the co operation of the French Foreign Legion. Eventually it became too dangerous and filming was completed at Beaconsfield Studios in London.

Its average cost was $26,000 an episode.

Reception
Variety said "Stories, acting, and production are of good quality.

One week the show was among the top ten shows in Britain.

References

External links
Assignment Foreign Legion at IMDb
Assignment Foreign Legion at CTVA
Review of episode "The Outcast" at Variety

1956 American television series debuts
1950s American drama television series
1957 American television series endings